Marylen Ng Poau Leng (born 19 December 1987) is a badminton player from Malaysia. She was the women's doubles champion at the 2010 National Circuit Grand Prix Finals with Woon Khe Wei. Partnered with Lim Yin Loo, she became the semi finalist at the 2008 Vietnam Open a BWF Grand Prix tournament. She represented her country at the 2010 Asian Games and 2011 Southeast Asian Games, and helped the team win the bronze medal in 2011 Southeast Asian Games.

Achievements

BWF International Challenge/Series 
Women's doubles

  BWF International Challenge tournament
  BWF International Series tournament
  BWF Future Series tournament

References

External links 
 

1987 births
Living people
People from Sabah
Malaysian sportspeople of Chinese descent
Malaysian female badminton players
Badminton players at the 2010 Asian Games
Asian Games competitors for Malaysia
Competitors at the 2011 Southeast Asian Games
Southeast Asian Games bronze medalists for Malaysia
Southeast Asian Games medalists in badminton
21st-century Malaysian women